Aviation Technology Group (ATG) was an American aerospace company, the developer of the ATG Javelin very light jet (VLJ). It was founded in June 2000 by George Bye and has since gone out of business.

Facilities

ATG was headquartered at Centennial Airport, with manufacturing facilities at Front Range Airport in neighboring Aurora. The postal designation of nearby Englewood is used as the company's mailing address.

On August 23, 2005, Will Schippers, ATG's CFO, reported that ATG signed contracts to lease two buildings located at Front Range Airport. “These buildings will be interim facilities until we build permanent production facilities currently planned for 2009.”

The first building was a  facility, and was being used by ATG Flight Operations to manufacture four FAA conforming Javelin aircraft as well as serving as test facility headquarters.

The adjacent building was being used to assemble production aircraft. ATG anticipated production of up to 10 planes at a time in the  facility. When production reached full capacity for these facilities, ATG expected to have hired up to 150 new employees.

Sales

As of November 5, 2007, there were 153 positions on the waiting list for the ATG Javelin.

ATG halted all further development on the Javelin in December 2007 after failing to get $200 million to finance further development. ATG laid off all employees and halted development operations on December 17, 2007. On May 27, 2008 ATG filed for Chapter 7 Bankruptcy. The company subsequently declared bankruptcy in 2008, ending the development of the Javelin.

Board of directors
 Chair - George Bye, founder
 ATG President - Charlie Johnson, former President of Cessna

References

External links
Aviation Technology Group website

Aerospace companies of the United States
Defunct aircraft manufacturers of the United States
Companies based in Arapahoe County, Colorado
Vehicle manufacturing companies established in 2000
2000 establishments in Colorado